Jenő Áts (born 12 March 1936) is a Hungarian former swimmer. He competed in three events at the 1956 Summer Olympics.

References

External links
 

1936 births
Living people
Hungarian male swimmers
Olympic swimmers of Hungary
Swimmers at the 1956 Summer Olympics
Swimmers from Budapest